The 2017 Florida Tech Panthers football team represented Florida Institute of Technology (FIT) during the 2017 NCAA Division II football season. They were led by fifth-year head coach Steve Englehart.

Schedule
Florida Tech announced its 2017 football schedule on April 11, 2017. The schedule consists of 5 home and 6 away games in the regular season. The Panthers will host GSC foes Shorter, West Alabama, West Florida, and West Georgia, and will travel to Delta State, Mississippi College, North Alabama, and Valdosta State.

The Panthers will host only one non-conference game against Virginia University of Lynchburg and travel to McNeese State of the Southland Conference and North Greenville whom is independent from a conference.

Rankings

Game summaries

Virginia-Lynchburg

at McNeese State

Shorter

at Mississippi College

West Florida

at North Alabama

at North Greenville

West Alabama

at Valdosta State

West Georgia

at Delta State

Awards and milestones

Gulf South Conference honors

Five players from Florida Tech were honored as All-GSC selections by the league's coaches.

Gulf South Conference All-Conference First Team

Antwuan Haynes, RB
Adonis Davis, DL

Gulf South Conference All-Conference Second Team

Romell Guerrier, WR
Kevin Purlett, TE
J.T. Hassell, LB

Gulf South Conference offensive player of the week
September 18: Antwuan Haynes 
October 16: Mark Cato  
October 23: Mark Cato

Gulf South Conference defensive player of the week
October 16: Adonis Davis

Gulf South Conference special teams player of the week
September 4: Max Erdman

References

Florida Tech
Florida Tech Panthers football seasons
Florida Tech Panthers football